Achatinella taeniolata, an O'ahu tree snail, is a species of colorful, tropical, tree-living, air-breathing land snail, an arboreal pulmonate gastropod mollusc in the family Achatinellidae.

This taxon is a subspecies of Achatinella viridans as there is a complete intergradation between them.

Shell description
The dextral shell is ovate-oblong, spiro-conic, solid, striatulate. The shell is more obsolete toward the apex and with slightly convex whorls. The shell has six whorls. Shell colors are glossy white ornamented with varying brown bands. The white columella is strongly toothed above and the margin is dilated, reflexed and appressed. The white aperture is irregularly semioval. The peristome is narrowly thickened outside, and strongly lipped within.

The height of the shell is 20.0 mm. The width of the shell is 11.0 mm.

Distribution
This species is endemic to the Hawaiian island of O`ahu.

Conservation status
This species is critically endangered.

References
This article incorporates public domain text (a public domain work of the United States Government) from reference.

taeniolata
Biota of Oahu
Molluscs of Hawaii
Endemic fauna of Hawaii
Critically endangered fauna of the United States
Gastropods described in 1846
Taxonomy articles created by Polbot
ESA endangered species